"Bad Habit" is a song by American musician Steve Lacy, released as the second single from his second studio album Gemini Rights on June 29, 2022. Lacy produced the song and co-wrote it with Diana Gordon, John Kirby, Fousheé (as background vocals) and Matthew Castellanos. 

"Bad Habit" became a mainstream breakthrough for Lacy. His first chart entry in the US, the song peaked at number one on the Billboard Hot 100. It also became the first song to ever top the Hot R&B/Hip-Hop Songs, Hot R&B Songs and Hot Rock & Alternative Songs charts simultaneously. Aside from the United States, "Bad Habit" was also a hit in several other countries.

Reception
Brycen Saunders of Hypebeast found the song to have a "funky bassline, smooth tempo and electronic effects", with its lyrics addressing "regret over a failed love interest". Tom Breihan of Stereogum called the track a "lo-fi, homespun take on the kind of thing that Prince might've once written", also writing that Lacy "layer[s] up his own harmonies" before "adding in a slick little human-beatbox breakdown".

Commercial performance
On the chart issued September 10, 2022, "Bad Habit" became the first song to top both the Hot R&B/Hip-Hop Songs and Hot Rock & Alternative Songs charts by Billboard. That same week, the song rose to number two on the Hot 100 and top ten on the Mainstream Top 40 chart. It also topped the R&B Streaming Songs, Rock Streaming Songs, Alternative Streaming Songs, and R&B/Hip-Hop Streaming Songs charts, as well as the all-genre Streaming Songs chart. "Bad Habit" reached number one on the Billboard Hot 100 on the chart dated October 8, 2022, and remained there for three consecutive weeks.

Music video
A music video was also released on June 29, 2022, featuring Lacy walking around and playing with a dog in an "empty space" with color-changing lights. He also wears the same outfit as in the video for his previous single, "Mercury".

Charts

Weekly charts

Year-end charts

Certifications

References

External links

2022 singles
2022 songs
Billboard Hot 100 number-one singles
RCA Records singles
Songs written by Steve Lacy (guitarist)
Steve Lacy (guitarist) songs